Handley Carr Glyn Moule  (23 December 18418 May 1920) was an evangelical Anglican theologian, writer, poet, and Bishop of Durham from 1901 to 1920.

Biography
Moule was schooled at home before entering Trinity College, Cambridge in 1860, where he graduated BA in 1864. He was elected a Fellow of Trinity in 1865, and became an assistant master at Marlborough College before he was ordained deacon in 1867 and priest in 1868. From 1867 he was his father's curate at Fordington, Dorset, with a stint of five years as Dean of Trinity College chapel, 1873–1877. In 1880 he became the first principal of Ridley Hall, Cambridge, and then in 1899 became Norrisian Professor of Divinity at the University of Cambridge, until his appointment as Bishop of Durham in September 1901. He was consecrated as a bishop in York Minster on 18 October 1901. As Bishop of Durham, Moule occupied Auckland Castle. The 1911 Census of England and Wales shows that he had in his household thirteen servants including a butler, two footmen, and a lady’s maid.

Moule was active in the Higher Life movement and was one of the speakers at the inaugural Keswick Convention.

Moule was an Honorary Chaplain to Queen Victoria from December 1898 until her death in January 1901, then an Honorary Chaplain to Edward VII for a couple of months until he was appointed bishop. In November 1901 he was elected an Honorary Fellow of St Catherine's College, Oxford, where he had been a Professorial Fellow previously, and in December 1901 he received the degree Doctor of Divinity (DD) by diploma from the University of Durham.

Personal life
Handley Moule was the eighth and final son of Henry Moule (1801–1880), an inventor and the vicar of Fordington for over 50 years. Handley was named after his godfathers Augustus Handley, a minister at Fordington, and Carr John Glyn (father of General John P. C. Glyn).  His brothers George Evans Moule and Arthur Evans Moule were missionaries in China, and another brother, Charles Walter Moule, was president of Corpus Christi. Two more brothers, Horatio Mosley Moule and artist Henry Joseph Moule are chiefly remembered as friends of novelist Thomas Hardy, who was well known to the Moule family. Moule's grand-nephew C. F. D. Moule was a notable theologian.

Handley Moule married Harriet Mary Elliott (1844–1914) (called "Mary") on 16 August 1881; they had two children, Mary "Tesie" Moule (1882–1905) and Isabel Catherine Moule (1884–1959). In 1907 Moule published a memoir on Mary's short life entitled The School of Suffering. Isabel married Robert Vere de Vere, a colonial judge.

Moule is buried in the churchyard of St. Cuthbert's Church in Durham.

Views and influence 
Moule had a considerable reputation as a preacher and persuasive speaker and expressed his emphatic support for Britain’s declaration of war against Germany in August, 1914, under the heading ‘THE GREAT WAR’. He wrote that he was old enough to remember the Crimean War and other wars, but on this occasion, it was more possible, ‘....without one reserve, for the Christian Englishmen to pray for ultimate victory, supreme and overwhelming, as for a thing certainly well-pleasing to God. Our state has entered on the struggle with a conscience clear as the day’. Of his contemporary bishops, he stood with the Bishops of London, Liverpool and Carlisle and the Archbishop of York in his pro-active support for the War. He underlined ‘the sacred duty of national self-preservation. I have long thought that the Germanic power has aimed at the political ruin of Britain". He asked his clergy to encourage recruitment to the Army since half a million volunteers were needed. He was proud of the report that 218,000 miners had enlisted, half from Durham, that nearly 2,000 men from the diocesan branch of the Church of England’s Men’s Society were on active service, and that Bede College former students included 4 dead on the Somme, 5 wounded, one MC, one DCM and one MM. He supported the extension of the franchise to women, ‘a grant in which I for one believe that great possibilities of good lie in waiting’.

Publications
Moule was a New Testament scholar who wrote over 60 books and pamphlets. He contributed the chapters on Paul's letters to the Romans, Ephesians, Philippians, Colossians and Philemon in the Cambridge Bible for Schools and Colleges (1891–98) and also wrote poems on religious subjects; he won the Seatonian Prize at Cambridge for sacred poetry 1869–1873 and again in 1876. He published at least two volumes of poetry in his lifetime, in addition to the prizewinning pieces. He wrote a number of hymns, of which "Lord and Savior, True and Kind" is probably the best known.

This is an incomplete list of Handley Moule's published works:

Christian Self-Denial: A Poem Which Obtained the Seatonian Prize, MDCCCLXIX, Deighton, Bell, & Co., Cambridge, 1869
Poems on Subjects Selected From the Acts of the Apostles, with Other Miscellaneous Pieces, Deighton, Bell, & Co., Cambridge, 1869
The Beloved Disciple: A Poem Which Obtained the Seatonian Prize, MDCCCLXX, Deighton, Bell, & Co., Cambridge, 1870
Tyre: A Poem Which Obtained the Seatonian Prize, MDCCCLXXI, Deighton, Bell, & Co., Cambridge, 1871
The Gospel in Polynesia: A Poem Which Obtained the Seatonian Prize, MDCCCLXXII, Deighton, Bell, & Co., Cambridge, 1872
The Brazen Serpent: A Poem Which Obtained the Seatonian Prize, MDCCCLXXIII, Deighton, Bell, & Co., Cambridge, 1873
The Victory Which Overcometh the World: A Poem Which Obtained the Seatonian Prize, MDCCCLXXVI, Deighton, Bell, & Co., Cambridge, 1876
Dorchester Poems, W. Poole, London, 1878
Christianus, A Story of Antioch: And Other Poems, Cambridge: Deighton, Bell, and Co., 1883
Thoughts on Union with Christ, Seeley & Co., London, 1885
Thoughts on Christian Sanctity, Seeley & Co., London, 1885
Thoughts on the Spiritual Life, Seeley & Co., London, 1887
The Epistle to the Ephesians, with Introduction and Notes, University Press, Cambridge, 1888
Outlines of Christian Doctrine, Thomas Whittaker, New York, probably 1889
 Philippian Studies, Hodder and Stoughton, 1890 (The Expositor's Library)
Life in Christ and for Christ, A. C. Armstrong & Son, New York, 1890
Veni Creator: Thoughts on the Person and Work of the Holy Spirit of Promise, Hodder and Stoughton, London, 1890
To My Younger Brethren: Chapters on Pastoral Life and Work, Hodder and Stoughton, London, 1892
Charles Simeon, Methuen & Co., London, 1892
Christ is All: Sermons from New Testament Texts on Various Aspects of the Glory and Work of Christ; With Some Other Sermons, E. P. Dutton & Co., New York, 1892
Jesus and the Resurrection. Expository Studies on St. John xx, xxi, London, 1893
The Epistle of St. Paul to the Romans, Hodder and Stoughton, London, 1894
Secret Prayer, Thomas Whittaker, New York, 1895
Colossian Studies: Lessons in Faith and Holiness from St. Paul's Epistles to the Colossians and Philemon, A. C. Armstrong and Son, New York, 1898
Ephesian Studies: Expository Readings on the Epistle of Saint Paul to the Ephesians, A. C. Armstrong and Son, New York, 1900
Phillipian Studies: Lessons in Faith and Love from St. Paul's Epistle to the Philippians, A. C. Armstrong, New York, 1900
The Old Gospel for the New Age, And Other Sermons, Fleming H. Revell Company, Chicago, New York, & Toronto, 1901
The Epistle of Saint Paul to the Romans, A. C. Armstrong, New York, 1902
From Sunday to Sunday: Short Bible Readings for the Sundays of the Year, A. C. Armstrong and Son, New York, 1904
Short Devotional Studies on the Dying Letter of St. Paul, Religious Tract Society, London, 1905
The School of Suffering: A Brief Memorial of Mary E. E. Moule, By Her Father Handley, Bishop of Durham, Society for Promoting Christian Knowledge, London, 1907
Messages from the Epistle to the Hebrews, Elliot Stock, London, 1909
Memories of a Vicarage, Religious Tract Society, London, 1913
Christus Consolator: Words for Hearts in Trouble, Society for Promoting Christian Knowledge, London, 1917
Letters and poems of Bishop Moule: Selections from the Spiritual Letters and Poems of Handley Carr Glyn Moule, Bishop of Durham (1901–1920), Marshall Bros., 1921

Some of these have been reprinted in recent years; some are available as e-books for the Kindle and other readers.

References

Sources

Further reading
 John Battersby Harford and Frederick Charles Macdonald, Handley Carr Glyn Moule, Bishop of Durham: A Biography, London: Hodder & Stoughton, 1922.

External links
 
 
Bibliographic directory from Project Canterbury
Handley Moule at the AGES Library
 

Bishops of Durham
Academics of the University of Cambridge
20th-century Church of England bishops
1841 births
1920 deaths
People from Dorchester, Dorset
Staff of Ridley Hall, Cambridge
Deans of Trinity College Chapel, Cambridge
Norrisian Professors of Divinity
Evangelical Anglican biblical scholars
Evangelical Anglican bishops
Evangelical Anglican theologians